Alfred Blackman Miles (October 29, 1888 – March 18, 1962) was an American biology and physiology professor and an football, basketball, and baseball coach for Middle Tennessee State University. He was its second football coach (and first "officially recognized"), second baseball coach, and first basketball coach.

Early years
Alfred B. Miles was born on October 29, 1888, in Murfreesboro, Tennessee, to Caswell Moore Miles and Eliza Howse Blackman. During World War I, he joined the American Expeditionary Forces (AEF) where he served in the 216th Aero Squadron. After training at Kelly Field in Texas, the unit deployed to Europe.

College football
The 1914 football season led by Miles was its first undefeated season, with five straight victories after a tie with Cumberland.

The First Fifty Years: A History of Middle Tennessee State College  recalls this story of Jess Neely's days playing for Middle Tennessee State Normal and coach Miles: "Jess Neely, a brilliant half-back and a handsome man on the campus, is remembered for his popularity among members of the opposite sex and for an incident that occurred just prior to a football game with Southern Presbyterian in Clarksville. Miles had done an exceptionally good job in mentally preparing his team for the game. He climaxed the pre-game, locker-room exhortation with a soaring call for courage and deathless allegiance to "dear Ol' Normal." Neely was greatly affected by the words of his coach for he leaped to his feet and, roaring like an angry bull, led the team in a rush to the doorway opening to the field. He misjudged the extremely low entrance, and his head received the full impact of the strip of wall above the doorway. He was revived shortly before the kickoff, but he never quite knew where he was, frequently huddling and aligning himself with the enemy." This was said to occur at a point near the 1917 season.

Head coaching record

Football

Basketball

References

External links
 

1888 births
1962 deaths
Middle Tennessee Blue Raiders baseball coaches
Middle Tennessee Blue Raiders football coaches
Middle Tennessee Blue Raiders men's basketball coaches
Middle Tennessee State University faculty
People from Murfreesboro, Tennessee
Coaches of American football from Tennessee
Baseball coaches from Tennessee
Basketball coaches from Tennessee